Athlitikos Syllogos Aris Thessalonikis, means Athletic Club Aris Thessaloniki, is a major Greek multi-sport club founded on 25 March 1914 in Thessaloniki. 

Nicknamed God of War, Aris was one of the strongest Greek clubs during the Interwar period with champion teams in football, basketball and water polo. Until nowadays maintains a remarkable tradition in basketball, while "established" the sport in the country with the great star player Nikos Galis and the team of the 1980s, which was voted as the best Greek team of the 20th century.

Departments
Aris is considered to be one of the most important Greek sport clubs and today maintains departments in many sports, including:

 Aris FC - Football
 Aris BC - Basketball
 Aris Volleyball Club - Volleyball
 Aris Water Polo - Water Polo
 Aris Baseball - Baseball
 Aris Ice Hockey - Ice Hockey

Honours

Football

Super League Greece
Winners (3): 1927–28, 1931–32, 1945–46
Runners-up (3): 1929–30, 1932–33, 1979–80
 Greek Cup
Winners (1): 1969–70
Runners-up (8): 1931–32, 1932–33, 1939–40, 1949–50, 2002–03, 2004–05, 2007–08, 2009–10
 Greater Greece Cup (Defunct)
Winners (1): 1971

Basketball

 Greek League
 Winners (10): 1929–30, 1978–79, 1982–83, 1984–85, 1985–86, 1986–87, 1987–88, 1988–89, 1989–90, 1990–91
 Runners-up (8): 1928-29, 1957–58, 1958–59, 1964–65, 1965–66, 1975–76, 1981–82, 1983-84
 Greek Cup
 Winners (8): 1984–85, 1986–87, 1987–88, 1988–89, 1989–90, 1991–92, 1997–98, 2003–04
 Runners-up (6): 1983–84, 1992–93, 2002–03, 2004–05, 2013–14, 2016–17
 Greek Super Cup
 Winners (1): 1986
 FIBA Saporta Cup / EuroCup Basketball
 Winners (1): 1992–93
 Runners-up (1): 2005–06
 FIBA Korać Cup (defunct)
 Winners (1): 1996–97
 FIBA EuroCup Challenge
 Winners (1): 2002–03

Volleyball

Greek Volleyball League:
 Winners (1): 1996–97
Runners-up  (2): 1993–94, 1995–96, 
Greek Super Cup: 
 Winners (1): 1996–97

Waterpolo
 Greek League
 Winners (4): 1927–28, 1928–29, 1929–30, 1931–32
 Runners-up  (1): 1930–31

Weightlifting

 2 Greek championships, Women: 1994, 1995

Ice Hockey

 4 Greek Championships: 1989, 1990, 1991, 2011

Korfball

 1 Greek Championship:2007
 1 Greek Cup: 2007
 1 'Beach Korfball Championship: 2008

Ball Hockey

 1 Greek Championship: 2009

Roller Hockey

 1 Greek Championship:2009
 3 Greek Cups: 2007, 2008, 2009
 1 Balkan Cup: 2009

Swimming

 1 Greek Championship, Women: 1994

Boxing

 1 Greek Championship, Men: 1972

Athletics

 1 Greek Indoor Championship, Women: 1991
 1 Greek Cup, Women: 1988
 2 Greek Cross Country Championship, Women: 1961, 1962

Anthem

The hymn of Aris or Aris Niketes (Ares Victorious) is the anthem of the club. It was written in 1926. The lyrics were written by Georgios Kitsos and the music by Secondo Poselli, son of the famous architect Vitaliano Poselli. The orchestration was made by the famous classic composer Emilios Riadis.

Notable athletes 
Football: Nikolaos Aggelakis, Kostas Vikelidis, Nikiphoros Vikelidis, Nikos Kitsos, Argyris Argyriadis, Kleanthis Vikelidis, Kostas Veliadis, Manolis Keramidas, Takis Loukanidis, Alketas Panagoulias, Konstantinos Drampis, Giorgos Zindros, Stelios Papafloratos, Theodoros Pallas, Alekos Alexiadis, Dinos Kouis, Vasilis Dimitriadis, Apostolos Liolidis, Traianos Dellas, Angelos Charisteas, Avraam Papadopoulos, Sergio Koke, Darcy Dolce Neto, Javito, Vangelis Platellas
Basketball: Manthos Matthaiou, Faidon Matthaiou, Anestis Petalidis, Michalis Romanidis, Vangelis Alexandris, Charis Papageorgiou, Nikos Filippou, Stojko Vranković, Vassilis Lipiridis, Lefteris Subotić, Giannis Ioannidis, Panagiotis Giannakis, Nikos Galis, Miroslav Pecarski, Roy Tarpley, Harold Ellis, Walter Berry, José Ortiz, Charles Shackleford, Dinos Angelidis, Panagiotis Liadelis, Giorgos Sigalas, Will Solomon, Nestoras Kommatos, Jeremiah Massey, Bryant Dunston, Kostas Sloukas, Kostas Papanikolaou, Sasha Vezenkov
Volleyball: Lyubomir Ganev, Plamen Konstantinov, Michalis Alexandropoulos, Giannis Melkas, Thanassis Moustakidis, Dimitris Modiotis, Kostas Prousalis, Nikos Smaragdis, Riley Salmon, Clayton Stanley
Water polo: Stelios Dimitriou, Agisilaos Zografos, Fotis Zografos

European honours

Notable supporters 

 Katerina Sakellaropoulou, President of the Hellenic Republic
 Arthur Abrahamian, President of the Armenian Community of Thessaloniki 
 Anthimos Ananiadis, actor
 Lelos Arouch, prominent member of the Jewish Community of Thessaloniki
 Albert Bourla, Chief Executive Officer (CEO) of Pfizer
 Yiannis Boutaris, fmr. Mayor of Thessaloniki
 Angelos Charisteas, member of the UEFA Euro 2004 winning team
 Spyros Charitatos, journalist
 Kostas Chrysogonos, jurist, Member of the European Parliament
 Giannis Dardamanelis, Mayor of Kalamaria
 Dimos Dasygenis, knitting entrepreneur, whom the Aris training center ("Dasygenio") was named after
 Serafeim Dedeoglou, significant entrepreneur, creator of luxury hotels in Thessaloniki 
 Vangelis Diamantopoulos, fmr. SYRIZA MP
 Efstratios Evgeniou, Chalkidiki Flour Mills SA's Chairman & CEO 
 B.D. Foxmoor, rapper and hip hop producer
 Christos Galileas, artistic director of Thessaloniki Concert Hall
 Nikos Galis, member of the Naismith Memorial Basketball Hall of Fame
 Kostas Gioulekas, fmr. Minister of Internal Affairs
 Evangelos Grammenos, president of the Hellenic Football Federation (EPO)
 Aris Grigoriadis,  world aquatics champion
 Giannis Ioannidis, fmr. Deputy Minister of Sport
 Ignatios Kaitezidis, Mayor of Panorama
 Sotiris Kalyvatsis, actor
 Vassilis Kechagias, President of the Greek Film Critics Association (PEKK)
 Giorgos Konstantopoulos, President of the Greek Exporters Association (SEVE)
 Vladimiros Kyriakidis, actor
 Zoe Laskari, actress
 Katerina Laspa, journalist, TV host
 Michalis Leanis, journalist
  Giorgos Lentzas,  journalist, TV host
 Giannis Logothetis, emblematic sports commentator
 Renia Louizidou, actress
 Nikos Makropoulos, singer 
Apostolos Mangiriadis, journalist 
 Marinella, singer
 Rodolfo Maslias, Head of  TermCoord of the European Parliament
 Faidon Matthaiou, FIBA EuroBasket Bronze medalist, the "Patriarch" of Greek basketball
 Antypas (Masloumidis), singer
 Michalis Mitrousis, actor
 Fanis Mouratidis, actor
 Alexandros Nikolaidis, Olympic medalist in Tae Kwon Do
 Alketas Panagoulias, fmr. US and Greece national football team manager
 Andreas Papacharalambous, Mayor of Strovolos, Cyprus
 Elena Papadimitriou, journalist
 Charis Papageorgiou, top scorer and champion in basketball
 Vasilis Papageorgopoulos, fmr. Mayor of Thessaloniki
 Akis Petretzikis, celebrity chef
 Secondo Poselli, composer of the Hymn of Aris Thessaloniki, son of Vitaliano Poselli 
 Emilios Riadis, significant composer and poet
 Konstantinos-Christoforos Rodokanakis, physician and essayist
 Akis Sakellariou, actor
 Nikolaos Sakellaropoulos, fmr. VP of the Supreme Civil and Criminal Court of Greece
 Margaritis Schinas, Vice-President of the European Commission
 Panagiotis Spyrou, pioneer cardiac surgeon
 Katerina Stanisi, singer
 Nikos Tachiaos, Chairman of Attiko Metro SA
 Kyriakos Thomaidis, journalist, TV host
 Ioanna Triantafyllidou, actor
 Nicholas Trimmatis, London based real estate entrepreneur
 Thanasis Tsaltabasis, actor 
 Vassilis Tsitsanis, leading composer of rebetiko 
 Vasilis Tsivilikas, actor
 Nikos Valergakis, fmr. President of Thessaloniki Bar Association 
  Foteini Velesiotou, singer
 Michalis Zorpidis, President of the Professional Chamber of Thessaloniki (EETH)

AC Αris Thessaloniki Presidents

Gallery

See also
 Aris Thessaloniki F.C.
 Aris B.C.
 Aris Volleyball Club
 Aris Baseball Club
 Aris Water Polo Club

References

External links
 Official website
Press
All about Aris 
Fans
 Super3 Official website
 Ierolohites Official website
 Official website of "ARIS Members Society"

 
Multi-sport clubs in Thessaloniki
Sports clubs established in 1914
1914 establishments in Greece